The following lists events that happened during 1914 in Southern Rhodesia.

Events
 The Nyamanda and Matabele National Home Movement stages a protest against the decision to vary "native" reserves in quality and size

Births
Earthquake trauma was felt all over the World signifying The birthday of Johanne (Elijah) the 7th Messiah of God of the end times was born in Southern Rhodesia now called Zimbabwe.

he died on 13 september 1973 in ndola zambia

References

 
Years of the 20th century in Southern Rhodesia
Southern Rhodesia